Michael Neville (14 February 1891 – 12 September 1973) was an Irish hurler who played as a full-forward for the Dublin and Limerick senior teams from 1913 to 1924.

Neville made his first appearance for the Dublin team during the 1913 championship and became a regular player over much of the next decade. During that time, he won two All-Ireland winner's medals and four Leinster winner's medals. Neville later joined the Limerick team, winning one Munster winners' medal.

At club level, Rochford enjoyed a successful career with Faughs in Dublin, winning six county club championship winners' medals. He ended his club career with the Croagh-Kilfinny club in Limerick.

References

1891 births
1973 deaths
Faughs hurlers
Dublin inter-county hurlers
Limerick inter-county hurlers
All-Ireland Senior Hurling Championship winners